Aabenraa (Sønderjysk: Affenråe) is a town in Southern Denmark, at the head of the Aabenraa Fjord, an arm of the Little Belt,  north of the Denmark–Germany border and  north of German town of Flensburg. It was the seat of Sønderjyllands Amt (South Jutland County) until 1 January 2007, when the Region of Southern Denmark was created as part of the 2007 Danish Municipal Reform. With a population of 16,401 (1 January 2022), Aabenraa is the largest town and the seat of the Aabenraa Municipality.

The name Aabenraa originally meant "open beach".

History 
Aabenraa was first mentioned in historic accounts in the 12th century, when it was attacked by the Wends.

Aabenraa started growing in the early Middle Ages around Opnør Hus, the bishop's castle, and received status as a merchant town in 1240, and in 1335 it received a charter. During the Middle Ages the town was known for its fishing industry and for its production of hops.

Between 1560 and 1721 the town was under the rule of the Dukes of Holstein-Gottorp.

The town's glory days were during the period of the 1750s to c. 1864, when ship traffic was at a high growth rate with trade to the Mediterranean Sea, China, South America, and Australia.  It possessed a good harbour, which afforded shelter for a large carrying trade, Aabenraa having the Danish monarchy's third-largest trade fleet, after Copenhagen and Flensborg.  The city had a number of shipbuilding yards, which were known for their fine ships.  The best known being the clipper Cimber, which in 1857 sailed from Liverpool to San Francisco in 106 days.  Fishing and various small factories also provided occupations for the population.

From 1864 as a result of the Second War of Schleswig it was part of Prussia, and as such part of the North German Confederation, and from 1871 onwards, part of the German Empire. In the 1920 Schleswig Plebiscite that brought Northern Schleswig to Denmark, 55.1% of Aabenraa's inhabitants voted for remaining part of Germany and 44.9% voted for the cession to Denmark. However, since a plurality of votes in the surrounding Aabenraa municipality voted to join Denmark, the town was thus ceded to the Danish crown.

After the 1948 Danish spelling reform, which abolished the digraph Aa in favor of Å, there was fervent resistance in Aabenraa. The town feared, among other things, to lose its status as first in alphabetical listings (and reputedly the first town alphabetically anywhere in the world), because the letter Å is the last letter in the Dano-Norwegian alphabet. A later revision of the spelling rules allowed for retaining the Aa spelling as an option. While the municipality of Aabenraa and most local citizens use the Aa spelling, Åbenrå remains the option recommended by the Danish Language Board.

On June 14, 2019, a low-end F2/T4 tornado touched down in Aabenraa. Two vehicles were flipped on the local hospital's parking lot.

Today 
The town has a  harbour, with a significant shipping trade.  There is various industry in the city, including Marcussen's Organ Building (Marcussens Orgelbyggeri) and Callesens Machineworks (Callesens Maskinfabrik).  The city is the administrative center for the county. Danmarks Radio has an office in the city. A German minority live in Aabenraa and they publish Der Nordschleswiger newspaper in German.

(Brundlund Slot), erected by Queen Margaret I 1411, and rebuilt in 1807, today is home to the Brundlund Slot Art Museum (Kunstmuseet Brundlund Slot). The town is a bathing resort, as is Elisenlund close by.

The city has several preserved neighborhoods from the 1800s including Slotsgade, Store Pottergade, Lille Pottergade, Nygade, Nybro, Skibbrogade and Gildegade.

Education 
A branch of University College South can be found in Aabenraa.

Notable people

The arts 
 Christoffer Wilhelm Eckersberg (1783 in Blåkrog – 1853) Danish painter, laid the foundations for the Golden Age of Danish Painting
 Anna Christiane Ludvigsen (1794 – 1864), poet who gained popularity in Southern Jutland
 Magda von Dolcke (1838 in Åbenrå – 1926), Danish stage actress, known for her relationship with King Oscar II of Sweden
 Emil Nolde (1867 in Burkal – 1956), German-Danish painter and printmaker, one of the first Expressionists 
 Karl Clausen (1904 in Åbenrå – 1972), Danish pianist, conductor, composer, and musicologist
 Lisbeth Balslev (born 1945 in Åbenrå), operatic soprano, especially in Wagnerian operas

Public thinking and public service 

 Andreas du Plessis de Richelieu (1852 in Åbenrå – 1932), Danish naval officer and businessman, became a Siamese admiral and minister 
 Ernst Reuter (1889 in Apenrade – 1953), the German Mayor of West Berlin from 1948 to 1953
 Frits Clausen (1893 in Åbenrå – 1947), leader of the National Socialist Workers' Party of Denmark (DNSAP)
 Camma Larsen-Ledet (1915 – 1991 in Åbenrå), politician, Mayor of Aabenraa 1970–1986 
 Bertel Haarder (born 1944 in Rønshoved), politician, longest serving Danish minister since 2001
 Jens-Peter Bonde (1948 – 2021 in Åbenrå), former politician and MEP
 Poul Mathias Thomsen (born 1955 in Aabenraa), Danish economist working for the IMF
 Eva Kjer Hansen (born 1964 in Hellevad), Danish politician - Venstre

Science and business 
 Christian Friedrich Ecklon (179 – 1868), botanical collector and apothecary, came from Åbenrå
 Michael Jebsen (1835 in Apenrade – 1899) ship's captain and ship owner, progenitor of the Jebsen Group in HongKong
 Niels Jacobsen (1865 in Åbenrå - 1935), architect and politician, Chairman of The Lego Group

 Jes Peter Asmussen (1928 in Åbenrå – 2002), Danish Iranologist
 Birte Melsen (born 1939 in Åbenrå), orthodontist

Sport 
 Morten Bruun (born 1965 in Åbenrå), retired footballer, played 464 games for Silkeborg IF 
 Curt Hansen (born 1964 in Bov), Danish chess Grandmaster
 Sidsel Bodholt Nielsen (born 1989 in Åbenrå), Danish handball player

Gallery

References

External links 

 Aabenraa Kommune (Danish)
 Aabenraa Ugeavis (Danish)
 Aabenraa Port
 Aabenraa Tourism (English)
 Jydske Vestkysten Aabenraa Newspaper (Danish)
 Der Nordschleswiger Newspaper (German)
 

Municipal seats of the Region of Southern Denmark
Municipal seats of Denmark
Cities and towns in the Region of Southern Denmark
Port cities and towns of the Baltic Sea
Aabenraa Municipality
Port cities and towns in Denmark